Technicals may refer to:

 Technical (vehicle), an improvised fighting vehicle often used in civil conflict
 TECHNICALS, a clothing brand owned by Blacks Leisure Group

See also
 Technical (disambiguation)
 Cambridge Technicals